The 1998 Manitoba municipal elections were held on October 28, 1998 to elect mayors, councillors and school trustees in various communities throughout Manitoba, Canada.

Cities

Brandon

Source: Winnipeg Free Press, 29 October 1998, A13, 113 of 121 polls reporting.  The final results did not significantly change Atkinson's margin of victory.  It is not clear if any of the council or school board results (listed below) are also incomplete.

1998 Brandon municipal election, Councillor, Ward One (Assiniboine)

Caldwell was elected to the Legislative Assembly of Manitoba in the 1999 provincial election, and resigned his seat on Brandon City Council.  Marion Robinsong was elected as his replacement, defeating five other candidates.  Robinsong is a retired teacher, and alumnus of Brandon University, and a supporter of the New Democratic Party.  She had been appointed to the Board of Governors of Brandon University shortly before her election.  Robinsong campaigned for Mayor of Brandon in 2002, but finished third against Dave Burgess.  As of 2007, she serves on the board of directors of the Brandon Regional Health Authority.

1998 Brandon municipal election, Councillor, Ward Three (Victoria)

1998 Brandon municipal election, Councillor, Ward Four (University)

1998 Brandon municipal election, Councillor, Ward Five (Meadows)

1998 Brandon municipal election, Councillor, Ward Six (South Centre)

1998 Brandon municipal election, Councillor, Ward Eight (Richmond)

1998 Brandon municipal election, Councillor, Ward Nine (Riverview)

1998 Brandon municipal election, Councillor, Ward Ten (Green Acres)

Winnipeg

See: 1998 Winnipeg municipal election

Towns

Neepawa

Electors could votes for six candidates.  Percentages are determined in relation to the total number of votes.

Rural municipalities

Brenda

Rockwood

Source:  Winnipeg Free Press, 29 October 1998, A13.  The results in the Free Press list all candidates in alphabetical order, and do not indicate which candidates ran in specific wards.

Persoage appears to have replaced Neumann on council at some point between 1998 and 2002.

Villages

Waskada

Electors could vote for four candidates.  Percentages are determined in relation to the total number of votes.

Results are taken from the Winnipeg Free Press newspaper, 2 November 1998.  The final official totals do not appear to have been significantly different.

Footnotes

Municipal elections in Manitoba
1998 elections in Canada
1998 in Manitoba
October 1998 events in Canada